Finland was represented by Carita Holmström, with the song "Keep Me Warm", at the 1974 Eurovision Song Contest, which took place on 6 April in Brighton.

Before Eurovision
The Finnish national selection consisted of two semi finals and a final. The shows were hosted by Matti Palosmaa.

Semi finals
It both semi finals eight songs competed and four songs qualified for the final. The finalists were chosen by regional juries.

First semi final

Second semi final

Final
The final was held on February 16 at Finlandia Hall in Helsinki. The winner was chosen by a professional jury consisting of 20 members. British singer-songwriter Roger Whittaker performed as an interval act.

The winning song "Älä mene pois" was performed in Finnish in the national selection shows but it was translated into English for the international Song Contest as "Keep Me Warm". The English lyrics were written by Frank Robson.

At Eurovision
On the night of the final Carita Holmström performed first in the running order, preceding United Kingdom. The entry was conducted by Ossi Runne. At the close of voting, Finland picked up four points and placed 13th of the 17 entries.

Voting

Sources
Viisukuppila- Muistathan: Suomen karsinnat 1974 
Finnish national final 1974 on natfinals

External links
Full national final on Yle Elävä Arkisto  

1974
Countries in the Eurovision Song Contest 1974
Eurovision